Fraddon is a village in mid-Cornwall, England, United Kingdom, in the parish of St Enoder (where the 2011 census population was included). It is roughly midway between Newquay and St Austell and is south of the linked villages of St Columb Road and Indian Queens.

Fraddon was formerly on the A30 road but a dual carriageway bypass now carries traffic south of the village.

Fraddon is the home of Dick Cole, Leader of Mebyon Kernow and Cornwall Councillor for St Enoder.

Just south of Fraddon is the settlement of Blue Anchor.

Its cookhouse & pub, The Penhale Round, beside the A30, is said to be built on the site of a prehistoric settlement (or is at least named after it) that has had evidence of occupation excavated dating back to the Middle Bronze Age (circa 1300-900 BC).

References

Villages in Cornwall